Ghouls are a fictional race of posthuman beings from the post-apocalyptic Fallout video game franchise. Within series lore, ghouls are originally humans, many of them survivors of a global nuclear holocaust, who have been severely mutated by the residual irradiation, which greatly extends their lifespans but deforms their physical appearance into a zombie-like aesthetic. Many ghouls live alongside humans in settlements across the post-apocalyptic wasteland, while others mentally degenerate into a wild and antisocial state. 

Considered to be among the most recognizable and iconic elements of the Fallout intellectual property (IP), ghouls have appeared in every media of the franchise, and have been the subject of numerous fan mods of Fallout series games. Critics have lauded their use as either antagonistic figures or as supporting non-player characters throughout the series, with some even calling for ghouls to play a more central role in future sequels or adaptations of the franchise.

Characteristics
The term "ghoul" in the Fallout series refers to human victims who were subject to prolonged exposure to radiation when they were caught outside during the Great War, a global conflict driven by the use of nuclear weapons which devastated much of the known world in the Fallout universe and provides the basis for the devastated world setting of the franchise. Those who survive experience genetic mutations caused by elevated levels of radiation develop widespread necrosis or rot on their physical bodies, though their lifespans are greatly extended which allows them to live for at least hundreds of years if not effectively immortal. Besides their prolonged lifespans, ghouls are no longer harmed by low-level radiation and even receive physical benefits when exposed to it. 

Ghouls who live within the rebuilt civilizations of the known world are similar to normal humans in terms of intellect or personality, but often suffer from discrimination due to their disconcerting physical appearance. On the other hand, Feral Ghouls have all but lost their mental faculties due to radiation damage and will attack other non-ghouls on sight. Feral Ghouls often roam together in packs and shamble around areas they are familiar with, such as a supermarket or a drive-in movie theatre, often with a form of muscle memory which vaguely drive them to relive aspects of the life they once knew, and trinkets looted from their corpses often provides hints or glimpses into their forgotten identities. Some ghouls, colloquially known as "Glowing Ones", have managed to develop bioluminescence, rendering their bodies capable of illuminating dark areas with a glowing green light, though they also emit large amounts of radiation which can heal other ghouls and are dangerous to non-ghouls. A new type of ghoul introduced in Fallout 76 are the Scorched, mutants infected with a virulent plague spread by large mutated bats known as Scorchbeasts; like Feral Ghouls, they are largely hostile to player characters but differ in their capability of operating firearms.  

In spite of their robust physiology and resilience towards radiation damage, ghouls are not as physically formidable as other types of mutated beings in the series, such as Deathclaws and Super Mutants.

Development
Ghouls were originally concepted as "Bloodmen" during the development cycle of the original 1997 Fallout video game. Media such as Forbidden Planet by Fred M. Wilcox and I Am Legend by Richard Matheson, along with real-life accounts of radiation poisoning, were cited as inspirations behind the concept of mutated creatures like ghouls and their exposed flesh for the early Fallout games developed by Interplay Entertainment. Character model designs were physically sculpted before they were scanned into the game. To produce the grotesque-looking skin textures of Feral Ghouls in Fallout 3, the first game in the series to be created by Bethesda Game Studios following their acquisition of the Fallout IP, artist Jonah Lobe reshaped photos of packaged chicken meat using modelling tools and filters to simulate a resemblance to human muscle tissue and create an "icky translucent" look for the relevant character models. The visual design for ghoul characters in Fallout 4 are somewhat different, though they also have a pronounced lack of nose, lips, and skin; the texture of their faces were described by Kate Gray from Kotaku as resembling melted Peeps in appearance.  

Obsidian Entertainment, the developers of Fallout: New Vegas, initially considered allowing players the opportunity to play as a ghoul or a Super Mutant for their protagonist in New Vegas. The team faced technical limitations as New Vegas shared the same engine as Fallout 3, and the developers realized that the game engine's equipment system would not work properly for player characters which use non-human character models. The officially licensed Fallout tabletop roleplaying game, developed by Modiphius and released in April 2021, allows players to assume the role of a ghoul character; Modiphius publishing lead Chris Birch said the inclusion of ghouls as a playable race among others was part of their design decision to make the game "authentically Fallout". As Fallout 4 takes place more than 200 years after the Great War, the game's developers explored the concept behind the longevity of ghouls through a place called the Memory Den located in the settlement of Goodneighbor, where those who survived the nuclear fallout and have retained their sanity could access and revisit their pre-war memories.

Appearances
Ghouls have appeared in every Fallout media, both as non-player characters in civilized settlements, and as hostile antagonists found throughout ruined or disused localities throughout the Fallout series. Players could also recruit ghouls as traveling companions or allies in several main series and spinoff video games: noteworthy examples include Dillon from Fallout Tactics, Raul Tejada from Fallout: New Vegas, and John Hancock from Fallout 4. Hancock in particular is available as a romance option if the player character builds a positive affinity with him through eliciting his approval of their actions. Prior to the Wastelanders update for Fallout 76, the Scorched were the only humanoid enemy faction that players would encounter in the game, replacing the series' standard human raiders.

Cultural impact

Promotion and merchandise
Feral Ghouls are featured as part of a range of Fallout-themed Funko Pop figurines which were first released in 2015.

Critical reception
Commentators have recognized ghouls, in particular the feral enemy variant, as an iconic and recognizable element of the Fallout media franchise. Tom Baines from PCGamesN remarked that Fallout 4 is a "a surprisingly good zombie game" due to its effective use of common zombie mechanics and tropes through player interactions with Feral Ghouls and the game world's post-apocalyptic setting, even though they are not technically zombies in the traditional sense. Lydia McInnes from The Daily Tar Heel concurred that Feral Ghouls have been used very effectively in Fallout 4 as a horror trope and that as enemies they "are scarier than they have any right to be". In a retrospective analysis of the history of the Fallout series' horror elements, Luiz H. C. noted that while ghouls were an integral part of the original games' well-executed blend of body horror and scary atmosphere, the more graphically detailed ghoul character models in recent entries have been used admirably to instill a creepy atmosphere in his view.

Individual ghoul characters have received particular acclaim for the way their physiology and psychology are presented within their respective story arcs. PCGamesN staff ranked Dillon and Raul Tejada among their list of best companion characters throughout the entire Fallout series: the former was noted for his useful gameplay utility as well as the moral dilemmas presented to the player due to his presence in their squad, whereas the latter was well received due to the exemplary performance of his voice actor Danny Trejo which they believed lent pathos to the character's tragic backstory. Kate Gray considered John Hancock to be a compelling and interesting character, with praise for his nuanced characterization as an anti-hero, romantic dialogue, and lack of judgmental attitude or behavior towards the player's actions. Samuel Horti praised the writing behind the New Vegas side quest "Come Fly With Me" and its use of an eccentric cast of ghoul characters, including the charismatic Glowing One Jason Bright, as the game's best and most memorable. 

The notion of ghouls as playable characters in the Fallout franchise have been of some interest. In his review of the Fallout tabletop RPG, Charlie Hall from Polygon praised the option of playing one to be "inviting". Jordan Forward from PCGamesN is fascinated by the idea of playing a ghoul archetype for the next mainline installment of the Fallout video game series, and deliberated the associated mechanics and limitations surrounding such a character at length.

Fandom
Ghoul characters are popular among Fallout fans as the focus for expressions of fan labor, such as cosplay activities, playable mods, and other media.

References

Further reading

External links
Ghoul at the Fallout Wiki

Fallout (series)
Bethesda characters
Fictional monsters
Microsoft antagonists
Mutant characters in video games
Science fiction video game characters
Video game characters introduced in 1997
Video game species and races
Zombie and revenant characters in video games